The Johnston Channel is a river geographically in Lambton County and on the territory of the Walpole Island 46 reserve of the Walpole Island First Nation, in Southwestern Ontario, Canada. It is a right distributary of the Chenail Ecarté (The Snye), and like that river also flows to Lake St. Clair; thus, it is part of the Great Lakes Basin. The river also separates Walpole Island to the west (right bank) from St. Anne Island to the east (left bank), which both are part of the Walpole Island 46 reserve of the Walpole Island First Nation.

Lake St. Clair flows via the Detroit River to Lake Erie.

References

Rivers of Lambton County